Maciej Woźniak (born 10 April 2001) is a Polish professional footballer who plays as a goalkeeper for III liga side Concordia Elbląg.

Career

Lechia Gdańsk

Maciej Woźniak started his career at Lechia Gdańsk. While at Lechia, Woźniak started playing for the Under-17's team at the age of 15, and learned from experienced Lechia goalkeeper Mateusz Bąk. In 2017 Woźniak started playing for the Under-19's. After that season Woźniak signed his first professional contract for Lechia in March 2018, signing a 1-year deal, and started training with the Lechia first team. While training with the first team, Woźniak found himself playing for the Lechia II team, becoming the first choice keeper and gaining valuable experience.

Radunia Stężyca

Despite being the second team's first choice goalkeeper for two seasons, Woźniak was unable to break into the first team, only appearing on the bench in games. In 2020 it was announced his contract would not be renewed and that he had agreed to join Radunia Stężyca for the following season.

References

2001 births
Living people
Polish footballers
Lechia Gdańsk players
Lechia Gdańsk II players
Sportspeople from Gdańsk
Sportspeople from Pomeranian Voivodeship
Association football goalkeepers
III liga players
IV liga players